Scott Lautanen is an American television director and producer.

His credits include Pacific Blue, The Pretender, Pensacola: Wings of Gold, FreakyLinks, Numb3rs, Bones, Moonlight, Terminator: The Sarah Connor Chronicles, CSI: NY and CSI: Miami (also co-producer and associate producer). He also worked as a second unit director on CSI: Miami and the series Dark Angel and She Spies.

He is of Finnish descent.

References

External links

American people of Finnish descent
American television directors
American television producers
Living people
Place of birth missing (living people)
Year of birth missing (living people)